RYG may refer to:
 Rodrigo y Gabriela, musical duo
 Anne Ryg, a Norwegian actress
 Eli Skolmen Ryg, a Norwegian television producer
 Jørgen Ryg, a Danish jazz musician and actor
 Kathleen A. Ryg, an Illinois politician
 The IATA airport code for Moss Airport in Rygge, Norway
 Raya Group